Biskra is a province (wilaya) of Algeria. The capital city is Biskra. Tolga is one of the famous daïras of this wilaya. Other localities include Lichoua, Sidi Okba, Sidi Khaled, El-Kantara and Ouled Djellal.

History
The province was created from parts of Oasis department and Batna (département) in 1974.

In 1984 El Oued Province was carved out of its territory.

Administrative division 
The province is made up of 12 districts and 33 communes or municipalities.

Districts

 Biskra
 Djemourah
 Foughala
 El Kantara
 El Outaya
 M'Chouneche
 Ouled Djellal
 Ourlal
 Sidi Khaled
 Sidi Okba
 Tolga
 Zeribet El Oued

Communes

 Aïn Naga
 Aïn Zaatout
 Biskra
 Bordj Ben Azzouz
 Bouchagroune
 Branis
 Chetma
 Djemorah
 Doucen
 El Feidh
 El Ghrous
 El Hadjeb
 El Haouch
 El Kantara
 El Outaya
 Foughala
 Khenguet Sidi Nadjil
 Lichana
 Lioua
 M'Chouneche
 Mekhadma
 Meziraa
 M'Lili
 Ouled Djellal
 Ouled Harkat
 Ouled Rahma
 Ouled Sassi
 Oumache
 Ourlala
 Sidi Khaled
 Sidi Okba
 Tolga
 Zeribet El Oued

References

External links 
  A website about Biskra and the surrounding area (also available in Arabic and English)
 Airport  

 
1974 establishments in Algeria
Provinces of Algeria
States and territories established in 1974